The Grimoire of Armadel (original title: Liber Armadel seu totius cabalae perfectissima brevissima et infallabilis scientia tam speculativa quam practiqua) is a minor 17th-century French Christian grimoire kept in the Bibliothèque de l'Arsenal. It was translated into English by S.L. MacGregor Mathers, and first published in 1980 after his death.

It should not be confused with British Library manuscript Lans. 1202 as "The Key of King Solomon by Armadel; Book 4: The Spirits which govern under the Orders of the sovereign Creator" (Clavicules du Roi Salomon, Par Armadel. Livre Quatrieme. Des Esprits qui gouvernent sous les Ordres du Souverain Createur).

See also
 S.L. MacGregor Mathers
 Grimoire

References

External links
Translation into English
 Bibliothèque nationale de France, Archives et manuscrits : Recueil sur les sciences occultes (dit Grimoire ou la Cabale par Armadel) ms. 2494

Armadel